Boris Alekseevich Kuftin (2 February 1892 in Samara, Russia - 2 August 1953 in Lielupe (now a part of Jūrmala)) was a Soviet archaeologist and ethnographer.  From 1933 to 1953, he worked in Tbilisi, Georgian SSR. In the 1930s, he discovered the Trialeti culture; and in 1940, he coined the term Kura-Araxes. He participated in the South Turkmenistan Complex Archaeological Expedition in the 1940s-1950s.

Kuftin became a member of the Georgian National Academy of Sciences in 1946.

Selected works

References

1892 births
1953 deaths
People from Samara, Russia

Soviet ethnographers
Soviet archaeologists
Members of the Georgian National Academy of Sciences